Wilhelm Johann Eugen Blaschke (13 September 1885 – 17 March 1962) was an Austrian mathematician working in the fields of differential and integral geometry.

Education and career
Blaschke was the son of mathematician Josef Blaschke, who taught geometry at the Landes Oberrealschule in Graz.
After studying for two years at the Technische Hochschule in Graz, he went to the University of Vienna, and completed a doctorate in 1908 under the supervision of Wilhelm Wirtinger. His dissertation was Über eine besondere Art von Kurven vierter Klasse.

After completing his doctorate he spent several years visiting mathematicians at the major universities in Italy and Germany. He spent two years each in positions in Prague, Leipzig, Göttingen, and Tübingen until, in 1919, he took the professorship at the University of Hamburg that he would keep for the rest of his career. His students at Hamburg included Shiing-Shen Chern, Luis Santaló, and Emanuel Sperner.

In 1933 Blaschke signed the Vow of allegiance of the Professors of the German Universities and High-Schools to Adolf Hitler and the National Socialistic State. However, he defended Kurt Reidemeister against the Nazis and, in the early 1930s, campaigned against Ludwig Bieberbach for leadership of the German Mathematical Society, arguing that the society should remain international and apolitical in opposition to Bieberbach's wish to "enforce Nazi policies on German mathematics and race". However, by 1936 he was supporting Nazi policies, called himself "a Nazi at Heart", and was described by colleagues as "Mussolinetto" for his fascist beliefs. He officially joined the Nazi Party in 1937.

After the war, Blaschke was removed from his position at the University of Hamburg for his Nazi affiliation, but after an appeal his professorship was restored in 1946. He remained at the university until his retirement in 1953.

Publications
In 1916 Blaschke published one of the first books devoted to convex sets: Circle and Sphere (Kreis und Kugel). Drawing on dozens of sources, Blaschke made a thorough review of the subject with citations within the text to attribute credit in a classical area of mathematics.

Kreis und Kugel, Leipzig, Veit 1916; 3rd edn. Berlin, de Gruyter 1956
Vorlesungen über Differentialgeometrie, 3 vols., Springer, Grundlehren der mathematischen Wissenschaften 1921-1929 (vol. 1, Elementare Differentialgeometrie; vol. 2, Affine Differentialgeometrie; vol. 3, Differentialgeometrie der Kreise und Kugeln, 1929)
with G. Bol: Geometrie der Gewebe. Berlin: Springer 1938
Ebene Kinematik. Leipzig: B.G. Teubner 1938, 2nd expanded edn. with Hans Robert Müller, Oldenbourg, München 1956
Nicht-Euklidische Geometrie und Mechanik I, II, III. Leipzig: B.G.Teubner (1942)
Zur Bewegungsgeometrie auf der Kugel. In: Sitzungsberichte der Heidelberger Akademie der Wissenschaften (1948)
Einführung in die Differentialgeometrie. Springer 1950, 2nd expanded edn. with H. Reichardt 1960
with Kurt Leichtweiß: Elementare Differentialgeometrie. Berlin: Springer (5th edn. 1973)
Reden und Reisen eines Geometers. Berlin : VEB Deutscher Verlag der Wissenschaften (1961; 2nd expanded edn.)
Mathematik und Leben, Wiesbaden, Steiner 1951
Griechische und anschauliche Geometrie, Oldenbourg 1953
Projektive Geometrie, 3rd edn, Birkhäuser 1954
Analytische Geometrie, 2nd edn., Birkhäuser 1954
Einführung in die Geometrie der Waben, Birkhäuser 1955
Vorlesungen über Integralgeometrie, VEB, Berlin 1955
Reden und Reisen eines Geometers, 1957
Kinematik und Quaternionen. Berlin: VEB Deutscher Verlag der Wissenschaften (1960)
Gesammelte Werke, Thales, Essen 1985

Namesake
A number of mathematical theorems and concepts is associated with the name of Blaschke.
Blaschke selection theorem
Blaschke–Lebesgue theorem
Blaschke product
Blaschke sum
Blaschke condition
Blaschke–Busemann measure
Blaschke–Santaló inequality
Blaschke conjecture: "The only Wiedersehen manifolds in any dimension are the standard Euclidean spheres."

See also
Affine differential geometry
Affine geometry of curves
Body of constant brightness
Web (differential geometry)
Pestov–Ionin theorem

References

External links
 

Nazi Party members
1885 births
1962 deaths
Differential geometers
Scientists from Graz
People from the Duchy of Styria
Academic staff of the University of Greifswald
Austrian expatriates in Germany
Austro-Hungarian mathematicians
20th-century Austrian mathematicians
Members of the German Academy of Sciences at Berlin
University of Vienna alumni
Academic staff of the University of Hamburg